Marco Antonio Marzolinus (died 1543) was a Roman Catholic prelate who served as Bishop of Guardialfiera (1533–1543).

Biography
On 27 August 1533, Marco Antonio Marzolinus was appointed during the papacy of Pope Clement VII as Bishop of Guardialfiera.
He served as Bishop of Guardialfiera until his death in 1543.

References

External links and additional sources
 (for Chronology of Bishops) 
 (for Chronology of Bishops) 

16th-century Italian Roman Catholic bishops
Bishops appointed by Pope Clement VII
1543 deaths